Frank Kühne (born 14 December 1961) is a German swimmer. He competed in four events at the 1980 Summer Olympics for East Germany.

References

External links
 

1961 births
Living people
Olympic swimmers of East Germany
Swimmers at the 1980 Summer Olympics
Swimmers from Leipzig
German male freestyle swimmers